Riegels is a German surname.  Notable people with the surname include:

Elna Riegels, birth name of the Danish painter Elna Fonnesbech-Sandberg (1892–1994)
Michael Riegels (b. 1938), inaugural chairman of the Financial Services Commission of the British Virgin Islands
Niels Ditlev Riegels (1755 - 1802), a Danish historian, journalist and author of critical pamphlets
Roy Riegels (1908–1993), American football player

See also
Riegel (surname)